A list of horror films released in 1961.

Notes

References

 
 

Lists of horror films by year